Upchurch is a surname. Notable people with the surname include:

Avery C. Upchurch (1928–1994), American mayor
Carl Upchurch (1950–2003), American activist
Greg Upchurch (born 1971), American drummer
Herbert L. Upchurch (1908–1979), American politician and educator
Ian Upchurch, New Zealand soccer player
James Upchurch (born 1968), American murderer
Joseph Upchurch, a victim of racist violence in 1927, see Lynching of Joseph Upchurch
Ken Upchurch (born 1969), American newspaper publisher
Phil Upchurch (born 1941), American musician
Rick Upchurch (born 1952), American football player
Ryan Upchurch (born 1991), American singer
Terrence Upchurch (born 1988), American politician
Woody Upchurch (1911–1971), American baseball player

See also 

 Upchurch, England

Surnames
Surnames of English origin
Surnames of British Isles origin
English-language surnames